Terraplane is the sixteenth studio album by American singer-songwriter Steve Earle. An album of songs in the blues genre, it was released in 2015 through New West Records. The album sold 11,200 copies in its first week of release, debuting at number 39 on the Billboard 200.

Track listing

Chart performance

References

External links
Official Website

2015 albums
Steve Earle albums
New West Records albums